Oreophrynella, commonly known as  bush toads, is a genus of true toads native to the tepuis of southern Venezuela and adjacent Guyana. The distribution of some species is restricted to a couple of tepuis or even a single tepui, as in the case of Oreophrynella weiassipuensis, which occurs on Wei-Assipu-tepui.

Description
They are characterized by opposable digits of the foot, dorsal skin that bears tubercules, and direct development (i.e., there is no free-living larval stage). The presence of opposable digits, unique among bufonids, in combination with an extension of the interdigital integument and the relative length/orientation of the digits, is likely to be an adaptation to facilitate life on rocky tepui summits and an exaptation to arboreality The genus also displays cranial simplification in the form of cranial fontanelles and absence of the quadratojugal, which may be driven by a reduction of developmental costs, increase in flexibility, and reduction of body weight. The cranial simplification combined with the shortening of the vertebral column and shift towards a partly firmisternal girdle may be adaptations to the peculiar tumbling behaviour displayed by Oreophrynella.

Species
The following species are recognised in the genus Oreophrynella:

References

External links
  taxon Oreophrynella at http://www.eol.org.
  Taxon Oreophrynella at https://www.itis.gov/index.html. (Accessed: May 1, 2008).
  Taxon Oreophrynella at http://data.gbif.org/welcome.htm

 
Amphibian genera
Amphibians of South America
Taxa named by George Albert Boulenger
Amphibians of the Tepuis